The Sapucaí Mirim Environmental Protection Area is an environmental protection area in the state of São Paulo, Brazil.

Location

The Sapucaí Mirim Environmental Protection Area is divided between the municipalities of Santo Antônio do Pinhal (34.26%) and São Bento do Sapucaí (65.74%) in the state of São Paulo. The APA protects part of the Mantiqueira Mountains, an imposing range covered by dense forest in the transition from Atlantic Forest to higher Araucaria forest. It protects the remnants of native vegetation of the region, the associated fauna and the headwaters of the Sapucaí River, which supplies water to 40 municipalities in Minas Gerais.

History

The Sapucaí Mirim Environmental Protection Area was created by state decree 43.285 of 3 July 1998 to protect the portion of the Sapucaí-Mirim River in São Paulo. It forms a continuous area with the Campos do Jordão Environmental Protection Area. The APA was created under an agreement between the governments of São Paulo and Minas Gerais to share environmental management in the border region between the two states. The same agreement covered creation of the Fernão Dias Environmental Protection Area in the headwaters of the Cantareira System reservoirs in Minas Gerais. The APA is part of the Mantiqueira Mosaic of conservation units, created in 2006.

Notes

Sources

Environmental protection areas of Brazil
Protected areas of São Paulo (state)
1998 establishments in Brazil